William Hall Napier (born July 21, 1979) is an American football coach currently serving as head coach at the University of Florida. From 2017 until 2021, he served as head coach at the University of Louisiana at Lafayette, amassing a 40–12 record in four seasons with three consecutive 10+ win seasons and two seasons finishing in the AP Poll, both firsts in the programs' history. Prior to Louisiana, he served as the offensive coordinator and quarterbacks coach at Arizona State University in 2017.

Playing career
Born in Cookeville, Tennessee, Napier was a standout quarterback for Murray County High School in his hometown of Chatsworth, Georgia, where he played for his father who was his head coach. He was named All-State in 1997 and accepted a scholarship to play football at Furman University. During his time with the Furman Paladins, Napier was a four-time letterman, and took over the starting quarterback duties for his junior and senior seasons. The Paladins won two conference championships during Napier's time there, and he was selected to two All-Southern Conference teams at quarterback.
In his junior year, he led his team to the 2001 NCAA Division I-AA Football Championship Game, losing to Montana, 13–6. Napier earned second-team All-Southern Conference honors in 2001 and 2002.

Coaching career

Assistant coaching

Early coaching career (Clemson, SC State)
After graduating from Furman, Napier headed to Clemson as a graduate assistant. Following a two-year stint as a GA at Clemson, he was then hired as the QB coach at South Carolina State in 2004. After only one year with SC State, Napier chose to return to Clemson when he accepted a job with dual roles as tight ends coach and recruiting coordinator on Tommy Bowden's staff. In his third year as TE coach and recruiting coordinator, Tommy Bowden resigned midseason after early season struggles that failed to meet high expectations, and Napier gave up his roles as RC and TE coach when he was named QB coach by newly appointed interim head coach Dabo Swinney. His new role also included assisting Swinney with the playcalling duties for the remainder of the year.

Alabama, Colorado State, Florida State, and Arizona State
When Swinney was promoted from interim head coach to full-time head coach after the 2008 season, Napier was promoted to offensive coordinator while retaining his duties as QB coach. After a 2009 season where Clemson would go on to win the ACC Atlantic Division behind the strength of Napier's offense that scored a then school record 436 points, a steep reduction in Clemson's offensive output led to Napier's termination at the end of the 2010 season. Within only a few weeks of being dismissed as OC at Clemson, Napier was contacted by Nick Saban from Alabama and offered a job as an offensive analyst. After spending the 2011 season as an analyst on Saban's staff, Napier earned a championship ring following Alabama's win over LSU in the BCS National Championship Game. As a result of his experience under Saban during the 2011 season as well as the time spent working closely with fellow Alabama assistant Jim McElwain, Napier was able to get back into hands-on coaching by following McElwain to Colorado State to become the QB coach and assistant head coach. Napier did not stay in Colorado for long—he was hired in January 2013 by Jimbo Fisher, then head coach at Florida State, to be the team's tight ends coach and recruiting coordinator, but departed less than a month later as Saban brought him back to Tuscaloosa to take over from Mike Groh as WR coach going into the 2013 season.

After a four-year stint as Alabama's WR coach including a second national championship in January 2016, he was hired by Todd Graham to become offensive coordinator at                                                                                                                  Arizona State. In Napier's first season back at OC since being fired as Clemson's OC back in 2010, his offense led Arizona State to finish with a 7–5 record and a Sun Bowl trip. Arizona State fired head coach Todd Graham after the 2017 season and brought in former NFL coach Herm Edwards, who stated publicly that Napier would be able to continue in his role as OC if he would like. However, Napier declined the opportunity to remain at ASU as the offensive coordinator.

Louisiana
On December 15, 2017, Napier was named the 26th football head coach at the University of Louisiana at Lafayette replacing Mark Hudspeth. His first season with the team resulted in a win of the Sun Belt Conference's West division and a bowl appearance (a Cure Bowl loss to the Tulane Green Wave), with a 5-3 conference record and a 7-7 overall record. 

Prior to the 2019 season, Napier's Cajuns were picked to finish first in the West Division  and picked to finish second in the conference , one vote behind Appalachian State. In addition, eight of his Cajuns were selected to the preseason all-conference team, a feat not accomplished since the early Hudspeth years. Napier's 2019 Cajuns finished with an 11-3 overall record (7-1 conference) and defeated the Miami RedHawks 27-17 in the 2020 LendingTree Bowl (January), his first bowl victory with the Cajuns and as a head coach. The following season, the Cajuns won the First Responder Bowl in 2020. In his career with the Cajuns, Napier's teams broke several school records, including the first double-digit winning season, first to receive votes in major national polls, first divisional conference championship, first win against a ranked team on the road, second win against a ranked opponent , the first-ever regular-season game to air on ESPN, and the highest-ranked team that the Cajuns have ever defeated (at No. 23 while previous ranked victory was at No. 25) . 

In his final season with the Cajuns, Napier finished 12–1 with a twelve-game win streak at the time of his departure. He also led the Cajuns to their first outright conference championship in more than 50 years and their first outright Sun Belt Conference championship. The team finished the season ranked 17th in the Coaches poll and 16th in the Associated Press poll.

Florida
On November 28, 2021, Napier was named the 28th head football coach at the University of Florida, replacing Dan Mullen. He was officially announced by Florida via a press conference on December 5, 2021.

Personal life
Napier resides in Gainesville, Florida, with his wife, Ali, and three children. Napier is a Christian.

Head coaching record

References

External links
 Florida Gators bio
 Louisiana Ragin' Cajuns bio
 247sports.com profile

1979 births
Living people
American football quarterbacks
Alabama Crimson Tide football coaches
Arizona State Sun Devils football coaches
Clemson Tigers football coaches
Colorado State Rams football coaches
Florida Gators football coaches
Furman Paladins football players
Louisiana Ragin' Cajuns football coaches
South Carolina State Bulldogs football coaches
People from Chatsworth, Georgia
People from Cookeville, Tennessee
Coaches of American football from Georgia (U.S. state)
Players of American football from Georgia (U.S. state)